Kevin Ray Turner (born February 5, 1958) is a former American football linebacker in the National Football League for the New York Giants, Washington Redskins, Seattle Seahawks, and the Cleveland Browns.  He played college football at the University of the Pacific.

His daughter is actress Bree Turner and he has three sons. Kale / UC Davis wide receiver . Dane / UC Davis Wide receiver . Anders / Cal poly linebacker

References

1958 births
Living people
People from Fremont, California
Sportspeople from Alameda County, California
Players of American football from California
American football linebackers
Pacific Tigers football players
New York Giants players
Washington Redskins players
Seattle Seahawks players
Cleveland Browns players